Don Bosco is a 1935 Italian drama film directed by Goffredo Alessandrini and starring Gianpaolo Rosmino, Maria Vincenza Stiffi and Ferdinando Mayer. The film is a portrayal of the life of the Catholic Priest John Bosco (1815–1888). It was made by Riccardo Gualino's Lux Film, one of the bigger Italian companies of the era. Alessandrini later went on to direct a later, more celebrated biopic of a nineteenth century religious figure with his Cardinal Messias (1939).

Cast
Gianpaolo Rosmino as Don Giovanni Bosco
Maria Vincenza Stiffi as Margherita, sua madre
Ferdinando Mayer as Giovanni Bosco as child
Roberto Pasetti
Vittorio Vaser
Felice Minotti
Cesare Gani Carini
Arturo Zan

References

Bibliography 
Moliterno, Gino. The A to Z of Italian Cinema. Scarecrow Press, 2009.

External links 

1935 films
Italian historical drama films
1930s historical drama films
1930s Italian-language films
Films directed by Goffredo Alessandrini
Films set in the 19th century
Films set in Italy
Italian biographical drama films
1930s biographical drama films
Lux Film films
Italian black-and-white films
1935 drama films
1930s Italian films